An unintentional discharge is the event of a firearm discharging (firing) at a time not intended by the user. An unintended discharge may be produced by an incompatibility between firearm design and usage, such as the phenomenon of cooking off a round in a closed bolt machine gun, a mechanical malfunction as in the case of slamfire in an automatic weapon, or be user induced due to training issues or negligence. The phenomenon has also been defined in scientific literature as an activation of the trigger mechanism that results in an unplanned discharge that is outside of the firearm’s prescribed use. Where prescribed use refers to departmental policies and laws related to the operation of firearms (O'Neill, 2018).

Types

Accidental discharge
An accidental discharge (AD) occurs when there is a mechanical failure of the firearm. This can include things like firearms that do not have mechanisms to render them drop safe falling a sufficient distance, a firing pin stuck forward, a sear failing, or rounds heating sufficiently to spontaneously ignite in the chamber (as may happen in a closed bolt machine gun).

Negligent discharge
A negligent discharge (ND) is a discharge of a firearm involving culpable carelessness. In judicial and military technical terms, a negligent discharge is a chargeable offence. A number of armed forces automatically consider any accidental discharge to be negligent discharge, under the assumption that a trained soldier has control of his firearm at all times. This is the case in the United States Army, Canadian Army, the Royal Air Force, the British Army and various Police Forces within the United Kingdom.

From an article on a U.S. Air Force website:

See also
Safety area
Queen's Regulations and Orders for the Canadian Forces

Notes
Forensic firearm examiners typically use more simplistic definitions limited to only two categories: unintentional discharge (no mechanical malfunction involved) and accidental discharge (mechanical malfunction involved).

Further reading

O’Neill, J., O’Neill, D. A., & Lewinski, W. J. (2016, November). A behavior analysis of unintentional discharges. The Police Chief, 83, 14-15.
O’Neill, J., O’Neill, D. A., & Lewinski, W. J. (2017). Toward a taxonomy of the unintentional discharge of firearms in law enforcement. Applied Ergonomics, 59(A), 283–292. doi: 10.1016/j.apergo.2016.08.013
O'Neill, J., Hartman, M. E., O'Neill, D. A., & Lewinski, W. J. (2018). Further analysis of the unintentional discharge of firearms in law enforcement. Applied Ergonomics, 68, 267-272. doi: 10.1016/j.apergo.2017.12.004
O’Neill, J., Hartman, M. E., O’Neill, D. A., & Lewinski, W. J. (2018, April). The ABCs of unintentional discharges. The Police Chief, 85, 14-15.
O’Neill, J. (2018). Functional behavior assessment of the unintentional discharge of firearms in law enforcement. Journal of Organizational Behavior Management, 38(4), 275-287. doi:10.1080/01608061.2018.1514348
Paulsen, J., (2017, March). 300 Negligent Discharges: Comprehensive Data Science. ConcealedCarry.com.

References

Accidents
Firearm safety
Military law